The Tunisian Ambassador in Washington, D.C. is the official representative of the Government in Tunis to the Government of United States.

List of representatives 

 United States–Tunisia relations

References 

 
United States
Tunisia